John R. de Vries is a Dutch designer of cars and trucks.

De Vries started at the design department of DAF in Helmond, where he worked on the design of Project 900, the Volvo 66,  successor of the DAF 66. In 1971, out of two of in-house designs and designs by Giovanni Michelotti and Bertone, De Vries' design was chosen for the car that ultimately became the Volvo 343.

In 1980, the first front wheel drive Volvo was in development, and once again competing with a number of Italian designs, Volvo in Sweden went for De Vries' design that became the Volvo 480 in 1986.

After his work for Volvo, he started to work for DAF Trucks in 1985, where he designed the DAF 95.

In February 1998 he designed the Alliance bus for Den Oudsten.

References

Dutch automobile designers
Year of birth missing (living people)
Living people